Wedgeworth is a surname. Notable people with the surname include:

Ann Wedgeworth (1934–2017), American actress
Colby Wedgeworth, American music producer
Marsha Wedgeworth, a.k.a. Marsha Blackburn, (born 1952), American politician and businesswoman 
Robert Wedgeworth, American librarian

See also 

 Wedgeworth, Alabama
 Wentworth